JJ Valaya (born 8 October 1967) is an Indian fashion designer and couturier from New Delhi, India. He founded the House of Valaya, a luxury fashion and lifestyle house in 1992, along with his brother TJ Singh. A founding member of Fashion Design Council of India (FDCI) and the first global brand ambassador of Crystal giant Swarovski. He has been designing for men and women, and has bridal and evening collections in addition to day-wear and ready-to-wear for over 20 years. As a fine art photographer, he released his first book, Decoded Paradox in 2011, in the same year as he also closed the day one of the Lakme Fashion Week (LFW) winter/festive 2011, debuting a fashion collection inspired by photography.

Early life 
Born Jagsharanjit Singh Ahluwalia on 8 October 1967 in the state of Rajasthan in India, Valaya spent most of his childhood travelling to different parts of the country due to his father's various postings in the Indian Army. He has completed his early schooling from the Yadavindra Public School, Mohali. Valaya studied commerce in college and initially planned to become a chartered accountant. However, he later studied fashion design at the National Institute of Fashion Technology, New Delhi (NIFT) where he graduated in 1991.

Career 
Valaya trained under a pioneer in Indian fashion Rohit Khosla, before starting his own label. With his elder brother Tribhavan Jit Singh, Valaya founded The House of Valaya in 1992 with the launch of its couture label. Valaya's creative vision together with his brother's organizational abilities have been the key factors for the success of Valaya as a luxury brand.<ref>The Sikh review, Volume 53, Issues 613–618. Sikh Cultural Centre., 2005. pp. 69.</ref> Around 2003, when he launched his pret line, he was already retailing fashion and lifestyle products under three brands: JJ Valaya, Studio Valaya and Valaya Home-Life, in which his first couture label, JJ Valaya'', comprising his trousseau line, launched in 1993. The brand today encompasses Couture, Ready-to-wear, Home and a CSR prerogative, The Free Spirit Foundation (FSF).

In 2010, Valaya's collection of ALIKA showcased at several events in Dubai was highly acclaimed. In this collection, the storyteller in him found expression through which he narrated the story of the female musicians of India's royal courts and their romantic affairs with the princes of the land. Alika, his fall/winter range consisted of finely worked jalabiyas, kaftan saris and anarkali-churidars. Valaya has used his couture creations to tell stories that intrigue him. That's perhaps part of the reason for his fascination with India's royal history. This collection also saw the birth of his signature Alika Jacket.

In 2011, Valaya's Winter/Festive collection at Lakme Fashion Week titled TASVEER received positive reviews. The collection combined Valaya's twin passions: photography and fashion. The collection was inspired by the evolution of photography from black and white to sepia to hand-stained, natural and digitised images. It was an interesting journey of colours and an amazing story, told through clothes. Valaya, in one of his interviews said “It’s almost like there are two personae in me: the photographer and the fashion designer. I intend to keep both alive,” there was also  about 10 menswear outfits that included sherwanis, bandhgalas, breeches and Nehru jackets.

In 2012, Wills India Fashion Week Valaya's collection AZRAK stayed true to its meaning – rare and common. The collection was inspired by West Asia and the Ottoman Empire of Turkey. His creations had juxtaposed elements of minimalism and grandeur, Western and Indian silhouettes, traditional motifs and modern drapes & feminine form. The range showcased saris, jackets, anarkalis, breeches, blouses and dresses. Showstopper Bollywood actress Kangana Ranaut was dressed in a pristine white gown teamed with traditional Indian jewellery and a rich brocade Maharaja coat. The surprise elements on the ramp were faces such as Suneet Verma, Rohit Bal, Navtej Johar, Jamie Stewart, Sumant Jayakrishnan and Navin Ansal to name a few, who were among the twelve showstoppers that took to the runway for the designer.
 
The year 2012 also marks 20 years of JJ Valaya's work in the fashion industry. The designer took a series of initiatives – launched a limited edition financial year calendar in Delhi. Shot by noted fashion photographer Tarun Khiwal, the April 2012 to March 2013 calendar has Valaya's close friends and "wonderfully inspired individuals".

Valaya introduced the 'Diasun', a pattern comprising two inverted 'V' and the sun motif from the JJ Valaya crest, which now comes on every garment produced by the label in some way or the other to put a stop to plagiarism and imitations of the market.

JJ Valaya is a founder member of the Board of Governors of the Fashion Design Council of India.

The designer currently has around 250 embroidered workers and craftsmen working exclusively for him out of 40,000 sq ft headquarters in Delhi.

His clothes have been worn by various GCC royals and celebrities including Joseph Fiennes, Cate Blanchett, Hrithik Roshan and Kareena Kapoor.

He remains one of the biggest names in the bridal trousseau market in India, and was one of the first Indian labels to invest in sampling, research and development at their "House of Valaya" establishment at Manesar on the outskirts of Delhi.

Awards and recognitions 
Founder board member of the Governing Council/ board of directors of the Fashion Design Council of India (FDCI). (1998)

References

External links 
 
 
 
 JJ Valaya as a photographer

Indian male fashion designers
1967 births
Living people
Clothing brands of India
Indian Sikhs
National Institute of Fashion Technology alumni
Fine art photographers
People from Jodhpur
Businesspeople from Rajasthan